Harry Slater may refer to:

 Harry Slater (politician) (1863–1936), Canadian politician
 Harry Slater (rugby), rugby union and rugby league footballer who played in the 1900s and 1910s
 Harry Slater (EastEnders), a character on the British soap opera EastEnders

See also
Henry Slater (disambiguation)